This is a list of Spanish television related events from 2020.

Events
12 March: Following the new rules under COVID-19 pandemic, Studio audience is prohibited in TV Shows.
14 March: As a consequence of COVID-19 lockdowns, many TV Shows got suspended, such as The chase, Amar es para siempre or Mujeres y Hombres y Viceversa.
 7 July - Josep Vilar is appointed Head of the News Department in Televisión Española.

Debuts

Television shows

Ending this year

Changes of network affiliation

Deaths
 18 January - Alicia Gómez Montano, jorunalist, 64.
 23 January - Félix Casas, actor, 89.
 23 March - Lucia Bosè, actress, 89.
 12 April - Mary Begoña, actress, 95.
 28 April - Michael Robinson, futbolista, presentador y comentarista deportivo, 61.
 3 May - Miguel Ors - sport journalist, 91.
 7 June - Pepe Martín - actor, 87.
 11 June - Rosa Maria Sardà, actress, 78.
 26 June - Jordi Mestre, 38, actor.
 21 August - Manuel Gallardo, actor, 85.
 13 October - Marisa de Leza, actress, 87.
 24 November - Montserrat Carulla, actress, 90.

See also
2020 in Spain

References